Is It Wrong to Try to Pick Up Girls in a Dungeon? is a Japanese anime series adapted by J.C.Staff from the light novel series of the same name written by Fujino Ōmori and illustrated by Suzuhito Yasuda. Crunchyroll has streamed the series internationally. Sentai Filmworks has licensed the anime for digital and home video release in North America with an English dub released in March 2017. The first original video animation was released on December 7, 2016.

A second season of the anime was announced on February 18, 2018, during the GA Bunko 2018 Happyō Stage at Wonder Festival. The second season aired from July 13 to September 28, 2019.  Hideki Tachibana replaced Yoshiki Yamakawa as the director of the second season.  The rest of the cast and staff reprised their roles. HIDIVE streamed a Dubcast for the second season.

A third season of the anime series and an OVA episode were both announced on September 27, 2019. The second OVA episode was released on January 29, 2020. The third season was originally scheduled to start broadcasting in July 2020, but the anime production committee delayed the broadcast to "October or later" due to the effects of COVID-19. On July 4, 2020, it was announced that the third season was rescheduled to broadcast in October 2020. The third season aired from October 3 to December 19, 2020, and ran for 12 episodes. On December 18, 2020, a third OVA episode was announced, which was released on April 28, 2021.

A fourth season of the anime series was announced at GA FES 2021 on January 31, 2021. The main staff from previous seasons are reprising their roles. Fujino Ōmori, the original author, will supervise the scripts alongside Hideki Shirane. The fourth season premiered on July 23, 2022, with the first half of the season aired till September 29, 2022, and the second half (titled DanMachi IV Deep Chapter: Calamity Arc) which aired from January 7 to March 18, 2023.

Series overview

Episode list

Season 1 (2015)

Season 2 (2019)

Season 3 (2020)

Season 4 (2022–23)

OVAs

Notes

References

External links
  
 
 
 
 

Lists of anime episodes